The 2009 UNAF Women's Tournament is the 1st edition of the UNAF Women's Tournament, an association football tournament open to the women's national teams of UNAF member countries. The tournament took place in Tunisia. Of the five UNAF member countries, Libya and Morocco chose not to participate in the competition. Tunisia won the competition after winning their two games against Algeria and Egypt.

Participants

Venues

Squads

Tournament

Matches

Final ranking

References

External links 
 UNAF: Coup d'envoi samedi du tournoi féminin – Info Tunisie

UNAF Women's Tournament
2009 in African football
Arab
International association football competitions hosted by Tunisia
UNAF Women's